Zhong Tianshi (born 2 February 1991) is a Chinese track cyclist. She represented her nation at the 2012, 2014 and 2015 UCI Track Cycling World Championships. In 2015, she became world champion in the team sprint and won bronze in the sprint.

At the 2016 Summer Olympics in Rio de Janeiro, she and her partner Gong Jinjie established a world record of 31.928 seconds in the qualification round of the team sprint event, before sprinting their way towards a gold-medal triumph for the Chinese track cycling team in the final match against Russia.

On 2 August 2021, she teamed with Bao Shanju and defended her Olympic championship in the women's team sprint at the 2020 Summer Olympics in Tokyo, thus becoming the first Chinese cyclist to win two Olympic gold medals. During the first round, she and Bao set the new world record of 31.804 seconds. While being awarded at the medals ceremony, Zhong and her partner Bao were seen on top of the podium with Mao Zedong pin-badges affixed to their team sporting jackets, alluding to symbolic patriotism; however, according to Graham Dunbar and Joe McDonald at Associated Press, this symbolism may have been in breach of Olympic Charter Rule 50 (which prohibits political statements on the podium), and that this "incident came one day after silver medalist Raven Saunders (standing below gold medalist Gong Lijiao of China) crossed the wrists of her raised arms on the podium", to which Dunbar and McDonald further suggested that it may have been "a response to the (Gong/Saunders) women's shot-put medal ceremony".

Major results

2014
Asian Track Championships
1st  Team Sprint (with Lin Junhong)
2nd  Sprint
3rd  Keirin
Asian Games
1st  Team Sprint (with Gong Jinjie)
2nd  Sprint
3rd  Keirin
1st Sprint, Hong Kong International Track Cup
1st Keirin, South Australian Track Classic
China Track Cup
1st Keirin
2nd Keirin
2nd Sprint
2nd Sprint, Adelaide Cycling Grand Prix
2nd Sprint, Super Drome Cup
2015
1st Sprint, Singen
1st Keirin, Oberhausen
1st Keirin, Öschelbronn
1st Sprint, Dudenhofen
Cottbuser SprintCup
1st Sprint
2nd 500m Time Trial
GP von Deutschland im Sprint
1st Sprint
1st Team Sprint (with Gong Jinjie)
3rd Keirin
China Track Cup
1st Keirin
1st Sprint
2nd Keirin
2016
Asian Track Championships
1st  Team Sprint (with Gong Jinjie)
1st  500m Time Trial
2017
National Track Championships
1st  Sprint
3rd Team Sprint (with Guo Shuang)
2nd Sprint, China Track Cup
2018
Asian Track Championships
2nd  500m Time Trial

References

External links

1991 births
Living people
Chinese female cyclists
Asian Games medalists in cycling
Cyclists at the 2014 Asian Games
Cyclists at the 2018 Asian Games
Olympic cyclists of China
2016 Olympic gold medalists for China
Cyclists at the 2016 Summer Olympics
Cyclists at the 2020 Summer Olympics
Olympic medalists in cycling
Cyclists from Shanghai
Asian Games gold medalists for China
Asian Games silver medalists for China
Asian Games bronze medalists for China
Medalists at the 2014 Asian Games
Medalists at the 2018 Asian Games
Medalists at the 2020 Summer Olympics
Olympic gold medalists for China
Chinese track cyclists